The 1894 European Rowing Championships were rowing championships held on the Saône in the French city Mâcon on 16 September. The competition was for men only, and the regatta had four boat classes (M1x, M2+, M4+, M8+). This was the second edition of the European Rowing Championships and the first time that the coxed pair boat class was included.

At the FISA Congress held on 15 September, five federations were represented.

Event schedule
FISA, the International Rowing Federation, had been founded in 1892 and one of the motivations for having the body is to standardise the rules of racing which varied greatly, even within countries. Race distances were variable. The 1894 European Rowing Championships were raced over a 2000 m distance for all four boat classes; it just so happened that the available straight on the Saône allowed for this race distance. Nevertheless, this became the standard race distance and the 1894 Championships are credited with having set this distance.

Four races took place on 16 September 1896. As only four teams competed, no heats had to be rowed. The teams represented France, Italy and Belgium. In addition, there was a team from Trieste. That city had only just (in 1891) lost its status as a free port and belonged to the Austria-Hungarian Empire. Contemporary sources list Trieste as being represented rather than Austria-Hungary. A rowing union had formed in Trieste and the decision had been made to send a coxed four to France. There were four rowing clubs competing for the honour to represent the port city. Three regattas were held during August that were all won by the team from Ginnastica.

Adriatic Cup (Coxed pair)
French Cup (Coxed four)
Belgian Cup (Single scull)
Italian Cup (Eight)

Medal summary

Footnotes

References

European Rowing Championships
European Rowing Championships
Rowing
Rowing
European Rowing Championships
European